The Board of Audit and Inspection (BAI) is a national organization headquartered in Seoul, South Korea. Its primary function is the audit and inspection of the accounts of state and administrative bodies.

See also
Anti-Corruption and Civil Rights Commission
Corruption Investigation Office for High-ranking Officials

References

External links
 

Government agencies of South Korea
Government audit
Supreme audit institutions
Jongno District